Tucker is a given name of mixed origin, likely deriving from the occupational surname referring to a "cloth-softener". The word 'Tucker' comes from the German word Tucher, meaning cloth-weaver.

People with the given name "Tucker" include

A
Tucker Addington (born 1997), American football player
Tucker Albrizzi (born 2000), American actor
Tucker Ashford (born 1954), American baseball player

B
Tucker Barnhart (born 1991), American baseball player
Tucker Beathard (born 1995), American singer-songwriter
Tucker Bone (born 1996), American soccer player
Tucker Boner (born 1993), American social media personality
Tucker Bounds (born 1979), American politician

C
Tucker Carlson (born 1969), American television host
Tucker Cawley, American television producer
Tucker Croft (??–1955), Irish footballer

D
Tucker Davidson (born 1996), American baseball player
Tucker DeVries (born 2002), American basketball player
Tucker Dupree (born 1989), American swimmer
Tucker Durkin (born 1990), American lacrosse player

E
Tucker Elliot, American sportswriter
Tucker Eskew (born 1962), American political strategist

F
Tucker Fredricks (born 1984), American speed skater
Tucker Frederickson (born 1943), American football player

G
Tucker Gates, American television director
Tucker Gougelmann (1917–1975), American army officer

H
Tucker Hibbert (born 1984), American snowboarder
Tucker Hollingsworth (born 1984), American photographer
Tucker Hume (born 1993), American soccer player

K
Tucker Kraft (born 2000), American football player

L
Tucker Lepley (born 2002), American soccer player

M
Tucker Martine (born 1972), American record producer
Tucker Max (born 1975), American author
Tucker McCann (born 1997), American football player
Tucker L. Melancon (born 1946), American judge
Tucker Murphy (born 1991), American-British skier

N
Tucker Neale (born 1972), American basketball player
Tucker Nichols (born 1970), American artist

P
Tucker Poolman (born 1993), American ice hockey player

R
Tucker Reed (born 1989), American murderer and author
Tucker Rountree (born 1981), American songwriter

S
Tucker Smallwood (born 1944), American author
Tucker Smith (1936–1988), American actor
Tucker P. Smith (1898–1970), American academic
Tucker Stephenson (born 1996), American soccer player

T
Tucker Toman (born 2003), American baseball player
Tucker Tooley (born 1968/1969), American film producer

V
Tucker Vorster (born 1988), South African tennis player

W
Tucker West (born 1995), American luger
Tucker Wiard (1941–2022), American television editor

Z
Tucker Zimmerman (born 1941), American singer-songwriter

Fictional characters
Tucker Foley, a character on the Nicktoon Danny Phantom
Tucker Jenkins, a character on the television series Grange Hill
Tucker McCall, a character on the soap opera The Young and the Restless

See also
Tucker (surname), a page for people with the surname "Tucker"

References

English masculine given names
English given names